Elarbi Khattabi (born 16 May 1976) is a  Moroccan long-distance runner who specializes in the 3000 metres steeplechase and cross-country running.

He was born in Casablanca. He is a world road relay champion with Moroccan team in Litochoro, Greece 1994.

His achievements in the 3000 metres steeplechase on the global level are a tenth place at the 1992 Olympic Games, seventh place at the 1993 World Championships and fifth place at the 1993 IAAF Grand Prix Final, before he competed at the 1995 World Championships. He then finished eleventh at the 1995 Grand Prix Final, the 1997 World Championships and the 1999 World Championships. He then finished eighth at the 1999 Grand Prix Final, and competed at the 2000 Olympic Games and the 2001 World Championships without reaching the final. On the regional level he won the silver medal at the 1994 Jeux de la Francophonie and the gold medal at the 2001 Jeux de la Francophonie. With 8:16.63 minutes in 2001 he set a new championship record. He also finished fifth at the 2001 Mediterranean Games and fourth at the 2002 African Championships.

His personal best times were 7.43.06 minutes in the 3000 metres, achieved in July 1998 in Paris; 8.09.03 minutes in the 3000 metres steeplechase, achieved in July 1999 in Rome; and 13.18.92 minutes in the 5000 metres, achieved in June 1995 in Saint-Denis.

At the World Cross Country Championships he recorded many top placements. He finished fourteenth in 1994, eleventh in 1995, sixteenth in 1997, eleventh in 1998 and 27th in 2002. He won silver medals with the Moroccan team in the team competitions of 1994, 1995 and 1997, and bronze team medals in 1998 and 2002. The team silver in 1994 was the first team medal claimed by Morocco in this event.

References

1967 births
Living people
Sportspeople from Casablanca
Moroccan male long-distance runners
Moroccan male steeplechase runners
Moroccan male cross country runners
Olympic athletes of Morocco
Athletes (track and field) at the 1992 Summer Olympics
Athletes (track and field) at the 2000 Summer Olympics
World Athletics Championships athletes for Morocco
Athletes (track and field) at the 2001 Mediterranean Games
Mediterranean Games competitors for Morocco
20th-century Moroccan people
21st-century Moroccan people